Herbert MacPherson (20 February 1869 – 12 November 1953) was an Australian cricketer. He played three first-class matches for New South Wales between 1893/94 and 1894/95.

See also
 List of New South Wales representative cricketers

References

External links
 

1869 births
1953 deaths
Australian cricketers
New South Wales cricketers
People from Mudgee
Cricketers from New South Wales